Jabari Brisport (born August 9, 1987) is an American politician, activist, and former public school teacher. He is the state senator for New York's 25th State Senate district in Brooklyn, and the first openly gay person of color ever elected to the New York State Legislature.

Early life and education
Brisport was raised in Prospect Heights, Brooklyn, by a Caribbean immigrant father and a second-generation Brooklynite mother. During Brisport's childhood, his father worked at a sheet metal factory, and his mother was an office manager. He graduated from Poly Prep, a private high school in Park Slope, Brooklyn. He attended New York University Tisch School of the Arts and the Yale School of Drama.

Career

Education 
Brisport taught math to 6th and 7th graders at Medgar Evers College Preparatory School, a public school in Crown Heights, Brooklyn. He is a member of the United Federation of Teachers (UFT) union.

Activism 
At age 22, Brisport began organizing efforts in support of a bill to legalize same-sex marriage in New York. The bill was defeated in 2009, but Brisport continued organizing around the issue and same-sex marriage was legalized in New York two years later.

A few years after that, Brisport got involved in the burgeoning Black Lives Matter movement and began organizing rallies and protests, as well as training protesters on what to do if stopped or harassed by the police. In 2017, he traveled to Charlottesville, Virginia, to march in the counter-protest of a Unite the Right rally.

Brisport joined the Democratic Socialists of America (DSA) shortly after Donald Trump's election as president, and got involved in their work on access to affordable housing. He quickly became a leader in the fight against the private development of the Bedford Union Armory in Crown Heights.

2017 City Council race
In 2017, Brisport ran against incumbent Laurie Cumbo in the 35th New York City Council District. In a rare Green Party primary, he defeated Scott Hutchinson, 32 votes to 4. Brisport was partially inspired to run for office by Bernie Sanders and Alexandria Ocasio-Cortez. He was endorsed by Our Revolution, New York Communities for Change, and the New York Chapter of Democratic Socialists of America. He lost the election, receiving 29% of the vote. Brisport earned more independent votes than any council candidate since 2003.

2020 State Senate race 

In 2019, Brisport announced a run for the New York State Senate 25th District seat being vacated by Velmanette Montgomery. On September 29, 2019, he was endorsed by the Democratic Socialists of America. His campaign did not accept any donations from the real estate industry or any for-profit corporations. Instead, it received donations from over 7,000 individuals, breaking the record for most donors to a New York State-level campaign. According to the campaign, it also had the support of over 1,000 volunteers. His campaign was also endorsed by Alexandria Ocasio-Cortez, Bernie Sanders, Cynthia Nixon, New York Communities for Change, and the Working Families Party.

On election night of the Democratic primary on June 23, 2020, Brisport led the race with 52.25% of the vote against sitting Assemblywoman Tremaine Wright and former Montgomery staffer Jason Salmon. But there were more absentee ballots than usual due to the COVID-19 pandemic, and on election night there were still 26,000 absentee ballots to be counted. Brisport declared victory on July 23, once the absentee ballots had been counted and his lead over Wright had grown to 10,000 votes. He won the November general election, becoming the first openly gay person of color ever elected to the New York legislature.

2022 State Senate race

In 2022, Brisport faced Conrad Tillard in the State Senate district 25 race. Brisport was backed by the Democratic Socialists of America and by unions including 1199SEIU and District Council 37. Tillard was endorsed by New York City Mayor Eric Adams, State Senator Kevin Parker, and former New York City Councilman Robert Cornegy. Tillard ran as a more moderate and centrist candidate than Brisport, and was critical of his support of socialism. Brisport won re-nomination in the three-way race, with 70% of the vote to Tillard's 16%.

Political positions
Brisport came to identify as a democratic socialist through Bernie Sanders's presidential campaign, for which he volunteered as a canvasser and phone-banker. He is a member of the Democratic Socialists of America (DSA).

Brisport was arrested while protesting the re-development of the vacant Bedford Union Armory in Crown Heights, Brooklyn. He argued that the development should be 100% affordable housing. He has advocated for a vacancy tax and a pied-à-terre tax.

Brisport, who is vegan, supports a ban on the commercial sale of cats, dogs, and rabbits, as well as on the sale and manufacture of fur clothing. He defends outlawing cruel animal farming practices and redirecting dairy subsidies into programs for dairy farmers to exit the industry.

References

External links
Official website 

Living people
New York University alumni
New York (state) Greens
Democratic Party New York (state) state senators
New York (state) socialists
21st-century American politicians
Male actors from New York City
Activists from New York City
Democratic Socialists of America politicians from New York
Tisch School of the Arts alumni
People from Prospect Heights, Brooklyn
Yale School of Drama alumni
Politicians from Brooklyn
1987 births
American gay actors
Gay politicians
LGBT state legislators in New York (state)
LGBT African Americans